Petar Atsev was a Bulgarian revolutionary, a voyvoda of the Internal Macedonian-Adrianople Revolutionary Organization (IMARO) for the region of Prilep.

Biography

Petar Atsev was born in 1877 in the village of Oreovec, then part of the Manastir Vilayet of the Ottoman Empire. From 1897 to 1901, he worked as a teacher in Prilep and Kruševo as well as in some villages in Macedonia. Together with his brothers Mirche and Georgi, he joined the revolutionary activity of the IMARO.

In 1901, Krastyu Germov, later known as Shakir voyvoda, became a member of his revolutionary band. At the beginning of 1902, Petar also became a freedom fighter, and in May 1902, he became a regional voyvoda for the Prilep region. Atanas Ivanov was then a member of his band. Petar Atsev was a representative of the Prilep revolutionary region at the Congress of Smilevo, where he was one of the principal antagonists to the idea of organizing and carrying out the Ilinden-Preobrazhenie Uprising. To explain his opposition to the Uprising, he emphasized the lack of armaments and ammunition in his revolutionary region. Petar Atsev, together with Georgi Pophristov and Lazar Poptraykov, was chosen a reserve member of the Uprising Staff, which was led by Dame Gruev, Atanas Lozanchev and Boris Sarafov.

After the end of the Ilinden-Preobrazhenie Uprising, Petar was chosen as an illegal member of the regional committee together with Pavel Hristov and Pando Klyashev. Milan Matov, Petar Neshev and Mihail Rakadzhiev were the legal members of this committee. Petar Atsev fought a number of battles against Turkish military units and Serbian and Greek bands in Macedonia. On 28 June 1904 the revolutionary bands of Petar Atsev and Nikola Karandzhulov, had a battle against a Turkish military unit near "Kyuleto", a place in the vicinity of the village of Selce, in which Nikola Karandzhulov was killed. In 1905, Trayko Kralya, Petar Atsev and Gyore Spirkov, nicknamed Lenishtanets, and Krastyo Germov had a meeting with Gligor Sokolovich, who used false documents to persuade them to let him enter Macedonia.

At the Congress of Kyustendil in 1906, Petar Atsev was chosen an additional member of the Central Committee of the IMARO, together with Petko Penchev, Pavel Hristov, Efrem Chuchkov, Argir Manasiev and Stamat Ikonomov. In 1907, he participated in the Battle of "Nozhot" (the Knife), together with the voyvodas Tane Nikolov, Ivan Naumov, Mihail Chakov, Hristo Tsvetkov and Mircho Naydov.

After the Young Turk Revolution in 1908, he was no longer an illegal freedom fighter and settled in Prilep. Two years later, he was arrested and for 15 months he was imprisoned in different prisons in Macedonia and Anatolia. He was released in the middle of 1911 and settled in Plovdiv, Bulgaria. He participated as a volunteer in the Balkan Wars, and also later in the First World War. Petar Atsev was a member of the Ilinden Organization.

He died in 1939 in Plovdiv.

References

1877 births
1939 deaths
People from Manastir vilayet
Bulgarian revolutionaries
Members of the Internal Macedonian Revolutionary Organization
Bulgarian educators
Bulgarian military personnel of the Balkan Wars
Bulgarian military personnel of World War I
Macedonian Bulgarians
Bulgarian people imprisoned abroad
Prisoners and detainees of the Ottoman Empire